Ranjan Dash is an Indian Industrialist. He is the co-founder and chief executive officer of Y-Carbon, a materials science company located at Philadelphia.

Early life
Dash was born in a Brahmin family in Hillapalli village of Sambalpur district, Odisha in 1976 to Ambika Dash & Dr Benudhar Dash.

Education
Dash graduated with honours in B.Tech (Ceramic Engineering) from REC Rourkela, now NIT Rourkela in the year 1998. He is an alumnus of the A.J.Nanotechnology Institute, where he did his research on the core technology that Y-Carbon is commercializing. He has a Ph.D in Materials Science and Engineering and MBA in Organization Management at Drexel University where he was the first student to pursue dual degree of a Ph.D. and MBA, both within 4 years.

Career
After graduating from NIT Rourkela, Dash worked as a senior officer in Tata Refractories Limited from 1998-2000. He then joined Network Program India Limited and worked there till 2002 when he went to US to pursue higher education in Drexel University. At Drexel, he met Yury Gogotsi, a fellow research scientist who was leading the group which developed Y-Carbon's core technology of which Dash was also a member. They used a novel chemical recipe to engineer nanoscopic pores into the carbon materials used in ultracapacitors.

References

External links
 
 
 
  at Y-carbon

1976 births
Living people
People from Odisha
Drexel University alumni